Naoharu (written: 直温, 直治 or 尚敏) is a masculine Japanese given name. Notable people with the name include:

, Japanese politician
, Japanese daimyō
, Japanese daimyō
, Imperial Japanese Army general

Japanese masculine given names